Delights of the Garden is the 2002 debut album by Desmond Williams. On his first full album, Williams delves into his Jamaican roots, tinging the electronica sound of his music with the dub stylings of that nation. He also shifts through other styles, such as bossa nova, soul, and drum & bass.

Guest artists on the album included vocals by Portia Joo and performances by Javier Miranda on congas, Chris Vrenios on guitar, and Niv on scratching.  Williams played all of the instruments on all of the tracks except for Um Favor (congas by Miranda), Theme from a Dream (guitar by Vrenios), and This Morning (dj scratching by Niv).

The album was recorded at the Eighteenth Street Lounge studios in Washington, D.C., and mastered at Masterdisc in New York City.

Track listing
All tracks written by Desmond Williams.

 "Um Favor" – 5:27
 "Cadence" – 4:42
 "First Touch" – 5:01
 "Theme From a Dream" – 5:00
 "This Morning" – 4:38
 "Dread A the Roughest" – 4:32
 "Spy Glass" – 4:33
 "Saturday" – 1:19 
 "Delights of the Garden" – 5:49
 "Oxygen" – 4:35
 "High Speed Drift" – 4:50
 "For the Trees" – 4:02
 "Brooklyn Blues" – 4:57
 "Wilcher Waltz" – 4:43

Personnel 
Desmond Williams – bass, guitar, keyboards, producer, beats
Portia Joo - vocals
Javier Miranda - congas
T. Austin Reed - keyboards
Chris Pupa Roots Vrenios – guitar
Steve Raskin – art direction, design
Howie Weinberg – mastering
The Williams Family – photography

References

2002 debut albums
Desmond Williams albums